Dornik Leigh (born 2 January 1990 in Croydon, London, England) is a British musician.

Career
Dornik started off being a ghostwriter for Odd Future and Syd Tha Kyd. He later was credited as producer and songwriter in those groups. In addition to that, he also collaborated with several other artists as well, in addition to being a prominent backing musician, performing with Jessie Ware. Notably being the male vocalist for the song, "Valentine." Due to the collaboration efforts with Ware, she was able to get him signed with Island Records, from where he released his self titled debut album, Dornik, in 2015. His follow up album, Limboland, was released in May 2020.

Discography

Albums
 Dornik (2015)
 Limboland (2020)

References

External links
Website

21st-century Black British male singers
British house musicians
British contemporary R&B singers
British soul singers
Living people
Singers from London
1990 births